The Mission Valley Formation is a marine sandstone geologic formation in the Mission Valley region of southwestern San Diego County in Southern California.

Geology
The formation's sandstone characteristics are: soft and friable, light olive gray, fine to medium grained, and composed mostly of quartz and potassium feldspar.

It overlies the Stadium Conglomerate formation, and underlies the Pomerado Conglomerate formation.

Fossil content
It preserves fossils dating back to the Paleogene period of the Cenozoic Era. The formation's rocks can contain a molluscan fauna in the western and central exposures and a land-mammal fauna in the eastern exposures.

Mammals

Eulipotyphlans

Ferae

Primatomorphs

See also

 
 
 List of fossiliferous stratigraphic units in California
 Paleontology in California

References

Further reading
 

Paleogene California
Geology of San Diego County, California
Sandstone formations of the United States
Geography of San Diego
Mission Valley, San Diego
Geologic formations of California